Kendrick Ings (born June 17, 1990) is an American football wide receiver for the Fayetteville Mustangs of the National Arena League (NAL). He has also been a member of the Dodge City Law (CPIFL), Detroit Lions (NFL), BC Lions (CFL), Tampa Bay Buccaneers (NFL), Baltimore Brigade (AFL), Atlantic City Blackjacks (AFL), and Carolina Cobras (NAL).

Early life
Ings attended Miller Grove High School in Lithonia, Georgia, where he was a member of the football, basketball and track & field teams. As a senior, Ings tore his ACL, and didn't qualify for college academically. Ings then planned to attend a junior college, where a paperwork error left him without a scholarship. He then spent a year as a student at Fort Valley State University. He then enrolled at yet another junior college, where he was told that he could not play football due to a heart murmur. Ings later decided to drop out of school.

Professional career

Early attempts
Ings attended an open tryout for the BC Lions of the Canadian Football League (CFL) in 2011, where he was told that he was too raw of a talent. Ings went on to join the semi-pro Atlanta Chiefs to help sharpen his skills.

Dodge City Law
Ings' play with the Chiefs landed him a spot on the Dodge City Law of the Champions Professional Indoor Football League (CPIFL).

Tampa Bay Storm
Ings attended an open tryout in November, 2014, and was assigned to the Tampa Bay Storm on November 20, 2014. Ings made the Storm roster after training camp. Ings was the Storm's third leading receiver on the season, while also serving as the team's primary kick returner. On October 8, 2015, the Storm exercised their rookie option on Ings, retaining him for the 2016 season. On June 21, 2016, Ings was activated from the Other League Exempt list. In 2017, Ings was named the AFL's Playermaker of the Year after leading the league in kick return yards with 1,063, kick return touchdowns with 4 and all-purpose yards with 2,219. He also finished second in receptions with 98 and third in receiving yards with 1,141. He also earned First-team All-Arena honors as both a wide receiver and a special teams player. The Storm folded in December 2017.

Detroit Lions
On September 9, 2015, Ings was signed to the Detroit Lions practice squad. On September 22, 2015, Ings was released by the Lions.

BC Lions
On March 8, 2016 Ings agreed to a contract with the BC Lions of the Canadian Football League. On June 18, 2016, Ings was released by the Lions.

Tampa Bay Buccaneers
On December 21, 2016, Ings was signed to the Tampa Bay Buccaneers practice squad.

Baltimore Brigade
On March 20, 2018, Ings was assigned to the Baltimore Brigade.

Atlantic City Blackjacks
On April 2, 2019, Ings was assigned to the Atlantic City Blackjacks.

Carolina Cobras
On May 11, 2021, Ings signed with the Carolina Cobras of the National Arena League (NAL). On November 8, 2021, Ings re-signed with the Carolina Cobras of the National Arena League (NAL).

Fayetteville Mustangs
On November 16, 2022, Ings signed with the Fayetteville Mustangs of the National Arena League (NAL).

References

External links
Arena Football bio

Living people
1990 births
American football wide receivers
Canadian football wide receivers
American players of Canadian football
Dodge City Law players
Tampa Bay Storm players
Detroit Lions players
BC Lions players
Tampa Bay Buccaneers players
Baltimore Brigade players
Players of American football from Miami
Atlantic City Blackjacks players
Players of Canadian football from Miami